Sit Down, Man is the second mixtape by American hip hop trio Das Racist. It was released as a free download by Greedhead Music, Mishka, and Mad Decent on September 14, 2010. It gained over 40,000 downloads in its first week of release. An album release show was held at Santos Party House on September 16, 2010.

Production
The mixtape is produced by Teengirl Fantasy, Chairlift, Diplo, Keepaway, and Boi-1da, among others. It includes guest appearances from Fat Tony, El-P, Kassa Overall, Roc Marciano, and Lakutis.

Critical reception

Pitchfork placed the mixtape at number 23 on the "Top 50 Albums of 2010" list.

"Hahahaha JK?" was placed at number 44 on Pitchforks "Top 100 Tracks of 2010" list, as well as number 48 on Rolling Stones "50 Best Songs of 2010" list.

Track listing

Personnel
Credits adapted from the liner notes.

 Sabzi – production (2)
 Gordon Voidwell – production, mixing (3)
 Alex Kestner – production, mixing (3)
 Boi-1da – production (4)
 Kassa Overall – production (5)
 Teengirl Fantasy – production (6)
 Devo Springsteen – production, mixing (7)
 Tom Cruz – production (8)
 Keepaway – production (9)
 Chairlift – production (10)
 Sha-leik – production (11)
 Dame Grease – production (12)
 Like Magic – production (13)
 Das Racist – production (13, 15)
 Dash Speaks – production (14)
 Mike Finito – production (16)
 Diplo – production (17)
 Scoop DeVille – production (18)
 Daniel Lynas – recording; mixing (1, 2, 4, 5, 8, 9, 11, 12, 14, 15, 16, 17, 18, 19, 20)
 Patrick Wimberly – mixing (6, 10, 13)
 DJA – mastering
 Katy Porter – artwork, photography
 Mishka – artwork, photography
 Himanshu Suri – executive production
 Le'Roy Benros – executive production

References

External links
 

2010 mixtape albums
Das Racist albums
Albums produced by Boi-1da
Albums produced by Dame Grease
Albums produced by Devo Springsteen
Albums produced by Diplo
Albums produced by Scoop DeVille
Albums recorded at WKCR-FM
Greedhead Music albums